Illunnguit Island (old spelling: Igdlúnguit) is an uninhabited island in Avannaata municipality in northwestern Greenland.

Geography 
Once inhabited, the Illunnguit Island is located in the outer belt of islands in Tasiusaq Bay, in the central part of Upernavik Archipelago. The inner waterways of the bay separate it from Paagussat Island in the north, and Tasiusaq Island in the east. It is one of the low-lying islands buffering Tasiusaq Island from the west. The highest point on the island is an unnamed  point in the southeast.

References

 Uninhabited islands of Greenland
Tasiusaq Bay
  Islands of the Upernavik Archipelago